California's 42nd congressional district is a U.S. congressional district in California.

The 42nd district is located entirely within Los Angeles County, and is centered around Long Beach and its surrounding suburbs.

Competitiveness

In statewide races

Composition

As of the 2020 redistricting, California's 42nd congressional district has been geographically shifted to the South Bay region of Los Angeles County. This district also takes in 2 of the Channel Islands, Santa Catalina and San Clemente, in the Southern California Bight.

Los Angeles County is split between this district, the 34th district, the 37th district, the 38th district, the 45th district, the 44th district, the 47th district, and the 43rd district. The 42nd, 34th and 38th are partitioned by S Gerhart Ave, Simmons Ave, Dewar Ave, W Beverly Blvd, Repetto Ave, Allston St, S Concourse Ave, Ferguson Dr, Simmons Ave/S Gerhart Ave, Highway 72, Goodrich Blvd, Telegraph Rd, S Marianna Ave, Noakes St, S Bonnie Beach Pl, Union Pacific Ave, S Indiana St, Union Pacific Railroad, Holabird Ave, S Grande Vista Ave, AT & SF Railway, Harriet St, and E 25th St.

The 42nd, 37th, and 43rd are partitioned by S Alameda St, E Slauson Ave, S Central Ave, Firestone Blvd-E 90 St, S Central Ave, E 103rd St, Success Ave, E 92nd St, E 91st, Croesus Ave, and E 97th St.

The 42nd, 38th, 45th, and 47th are partitioned by Yates Ave, E Acco St, 6866 E Washington Blvd-2808 Vail Ave, S 14th St, AT & SF Railway, Church Rd, Telegraph Rd, Rio Hondo River, Veterans Memorial Park, Suva St, Guatemala Ave, Shady Oak Dr, Coolgrove Dr, Gallatin Rd, Samoline Ave, Paramount Blvd, Arrington Ave, Suva St, Charloma Dr, Lubet St, Highway 5, San Gabriel River, Palo Verde Ave, South St, Del Amo Blvd, Pioneer Blvd, Coyote Creek, Centralia Creek, Hawaiian Ave, Verne Ave, Bloomfield Park, Highway 605, 226th St, Dorado Cir, Cortner Ave, E Woodson St, Bloomfield Ave, Lilly Ave, Marna Ave, Los Alamos Channel, and the San Gabriel Bike Path.

The 42nd and 44th are partitioned by S Alameda St, Southern Pacific Railroad, Ardmore Ave, Long Beach Blvd, Pacific Blvd, Cudahy St, 2622 Cudahy St-3211 Santa Ana St, Santa Ana St, Salt Lake Ave, Patata St, 7038 Dinwiddie St-10112 Karmont Ave, Imperial Highway, Old River School Rd, Union Pacific Railroad, Gardendale St, Century Blvd, Highway 19. Laurel St, Clark Ave, Beach St, Bellflower Blvd, E Carson St, Woodruff Ave, Gonda Ave, E Wardlow Rd, N Los Coyotes Diagonal, McNab Ave, E Spring St, E Harvey Way, Faculty Ave, E Carson St, Norse Way, Lakewood Golf Course, Cover St, E 36th St, Cherry Ave, Atlantic Ave, E Willow St, Long Beach Blvd, Highway 1, Oregon Ave, W Anaheim St, Los Angeles River, Canal Ave, W 19th St, Santa Fe Ave, Seabright Ave, W 25th St, W Willow St, Middle Rd-East Rd, 2300 E Pacific Coast Highway-W Anaheim St, E Anaheim St-Cerritos Channel, Piers S Ave, Highway 47, and Navy Mole Rd.

The 42nd district takes in the cities of Downey, Huntington Park, Bell, Bell Gardens, Maywood, Signal Hill, south Long Beach, east side Lakewood and most of Bellflower.

Cities & CDP with 10,000 or more people
 Los Angeles - 3,898,747
 Long Beach - 466,742
 Downey - 114,355
 Lakewood - 82,496
 Bellflower - 79,190
 Huntington Park - 54,883
 Bell Gardens - 39,501
 Bell - 33,559
 Maywood - 26,973
 Signal Hill - 11,848

List of members representing the district

Election results

1972

1974

1976

1978

1980

1982

1984

1986

1988

1990

1992

1994

1996

1998

1999 (Special)

2000

2002

2004

2006

2008

2010

2012

2014

2016

2018

2020

2022

Historical district boundaries

From 2003 to 2013, the district covered parts of Los Angeles, Orange, and San Bernardino counties in Southern California.

See also
List of United States congressional districts

References

External links
GovTrack.us: California's 42nd congressional district
RAND California Election Returns: District Definitions
California Voter Foundation map - CD42
The Centrist OC Blog Election Page
Ballotpedia

42
Government of Los Angeles County, California
Government of San Bernardino County, California
Constituencies established in 1973
Temecula, California
1973 establishments in California